The first USS Kiowa (SP-711), later USS SP-711, was a United States Navy patrol vessel in commission from 1917 to 1918.

Kiowa was built as a private motorboat of the same name by George Lawley & Son at Neponset, Massachusetts, in 1915. On 5 May 1917, the U.S. Navy acquired her from her owner, Frank A. Marwell, for use as a section patrol boat during World War I. She was commissioned as USS Kiowa (SP-711) on either 14 May or 18 June 1917.

Assigned to the 1st Naval District in northern New England, Kiowa carried out patrol duties in the Boston, Massachusetts, area for the rest of World War I. In April 1918, she was renamed USS SP-711, presumably to avoid confusion with the cargo ship  , which had been commissioned in February 1918.

SP-711 was decommissioned on 24 November 1918 and returned to Marwell on 28 March 1919.

Notes

References

Department of the Navy Naval History and Heritage Command Online Library of Selected Images: U.S. Navy Ships: USS Kiowa (SP-711), 1917-1919. Later renamed SP-711
NavSource Online: Section Patrol Craft Photo Archive Kiowa (SP 711)

Patrol vessels of the United States Navy
World War I patrol vessels of the United States
Ships built in Boston
1915 ships